Amphinectria is a genus in the Tubeufiaceae family of fungi. This is a monotypic genus, containing the single species Amphinectria portoricensis, first described scientifically by Carlo Luigi Spegazzini in 1924.

References

External links 
 Amphinectria at Index Fungorum

Tubeufiaceae
Monotypic Dothideomycetes genera
Taxa named by Carlo Luigi Spegazzini